Joe Eugene Mann (July 8, 1922 – September 19, 1944) was a United States Army soldier and a recipient of the United States military's highest decoration – the Medal of Honor – for his actions in World War II.

Biography
Mann joined the Army from Seattle, Washington in August 1942, and by September 18, 1944 was serving as a private first class in Company H, 502nd Parachute Infantry Regiment, 101st Airborne Division. On that day, in Best, the Netherlands, he single-handedly destroyed an enemy emplacement and continued to fire on the enemy from an exposed position until being wounded. Despite his wounds, he insisted on serving guard duty during the night. The next morning, during an enemy attack, Mann smothered the blast of a hand grenade with his body, sacrificing himself to protect those around him. For these actions, he was posthumously awarded the Medal of Honor a year later, on August 30, 1945.

Mann, aged 22 at his death, was buried in Greenwood Memorial Terrace, Spokane, Washington.

Medal of Honor citation
Private First Class Mann's official Medal of Honor citation reads:
He distinguished himself by conspicuous gallantry above and beyond the call of duty. On 18 September 1944, in the vicinity of Best, Holland [sic], his platoon, attempting to seize the bridge across the Wilhelmina Canal, was surrounded and isolated by an enemy force greatly superior in personnel and firepower. Acting as lead scout, Pfc. Mann boldly crept to within rocket-launcher range of an enemy artillery position and, in the face of heavy enemy fire, destroyed an 88mm gun and an ammunition dump. Completely disregarding the great danger involved, he remained in his exposed position, and, with his M-1 rifle, killed the enemy one by one until he was wounded 4 times. Taken to a covered position, he insisted on returning to a forward position to stand guard during the night. On the following morning the enemy launched a concerted attack and advanced to within a few yards of the position, throwing hand grenades as they approached. One of these landed within a few feet of Pfc. Joe E. Mann. Unable to raise his arms, which were bandaged to his body, he yelled "grenade" and threw his body over the grenade, and as it exploded, died. His outstanding gallantry above and beyond the call of duty and his magnificent conduct were an everlasting inspiration to his comrades for whom he gave his life.

Honored in ship naming
The United States Army ship  was in service from 31 October 1947 until she was transferred to the Navy on 7 Aug 1950.

Memorial
In remembrance of Pfc. Joe E. Mann, a memorial monument was placed at the site of his death. Near the same site, in the forest between Best and Son (described sometimes as the 'Sonse forest'), an open-air theater (which remains in use today) was named after him. This forest also contains a second memorial dedicated in Joe's name, the Pelican Monument, that depicts the mythical story of a pelican mother sacrificing herself to save her babies with her own flesh and blood, and an adjacent road also carries his name.

The PFC Joe E. Mann Army Reserve Center was named for him. The Reserve Center building began serving soldiers in 1957 and was operational for 40 years and 6 months. The Reserve Unit was relocated to Fairchild Airforce Base and the building was closed in 2010.

See also

List of Medal of Honor recipients for World War II

Notes

References

External links

 

1922 births
1944 deaths
United States Army personnel killed in World War II
United States Army Medal of Honor recipients
People from Lincoln County, Washington
United States Army soldiers
World War II recipients of the Medal of Honor
Deaths by hand grenade